Alan Brown (born 12 August 1970) is a Scottish National Party (SNP) politician who has been the Member of Parliament (MP) for Kilmarnock and Loudoun since 2015. Brown has served as the SNP Spokesperson for Energy and Industrial Strategy since December 2022. Brown served as the SNP Shadow Minister for Energy and Climate Change from 2020 to 2022, the SNP Shadow Secretary of State for Transport from 2017 to 2020, and the SNP Infrastructure and Energy Spokesperson in the House of Commons from 2017 to 2018.

Background and education
Brown was born on 12 August 1970 to parents Eric and Irene in Kilmarnock; Brown has lived there all his life. He attended his local primary school and Loudoun Academy. He subsequently attended Glasgow University, where he graduated with an honours degree in civil engineering. He worked, both in the public and private sectors, as a Civil engineer.

Political career

Councillor
He was first elected as a SNP councillor in the 2007 East Ayrshire Council election for the Irvine Valley ward, topping the poll with 1,497 first preferences. He was re-elected in the 2012 East Ayrshire Council election, taking the second seat on this occasion with 1,252 first preferences but again exceeding the quota. A senior figure in the SNP delegation, he has held positions Housing and Strategic Planning & Resources.

Member of Parliament (2015–present)

General election, 2015
Brown was selected to contest the Kilmarnock and Loudoun constituency for the Scottish National Party at the 2015 general election and received 30,000 votes (a 55.7% share); defeating the sitting Labour MP, Cathy Jamieson. The first Scottish seat to be declared on election night, the seat was the first of fifty SNP net gains made at that year's general election. He made his maiden speech on 22 June, in which he quoted the poem Is There for Honest Poverty by Robert Burns.

In 2016, Brown was one of 58 Scottish MPs who voted against the renewal of the UK's Trident nuclear programme. He claimed the programme had not served as a deterrent and that each job created through it cost the UK taxpayer £6.5 million.

Brown has revealed that Hansard reporters in Parliament often ask him to provide written 'translations'' of his questions to the Commons due to his thick Ayrshire accent being difficult to understand. Even so, he has said he would not alter his accent because his constituents “know me locally and know how I talk, they would actually question what was happening if my accent changed when I came down to Westminster”.

General election, 2017

Despite the SNP losing seats and support at the 2017 general election, Brown was re-elected as MP for Kilmarnock and Loudoun with a majority of 6,269 votes.

Frontbencher

On 20 June 2017, Brown was appointed to the Frontbench Team of Ian Blackford as the SNP spokesperson on Transport, Infrastructure and Energy in the Palace of Westminster. In 2019 during a reshuffle, Brown was appointed to the role of SNP spokesperson on Energy and Climate Change by Iain Blackford.

Brown also held the position of spokesperson for the SNP in Westminster for Transport, a position held from 2017 until 2020. Brown currently sits on the Business, Energy and Industrial Strategy Committee within the House of Commons.

General election, 2019

Brown contested the parliamentary seat of Kilmarnock and Loudoun in the 2019 general election. Brown won the election, receiving a majority of 12,659 based on a 63.9% voter turnout within the constituency.

Personal life 
Brown is married and has two sons.

References

External links
 alanbrownsnp.org

 
 Profile on SNP website

1970 births
Alumni of the University of Glasgow
Living people
Members of the Parliament of the United Kingdom for Scottish constituencies
People from Kilmarnock
Scottish civil engineers
Scottish National Party councillors
Scottish National Party MPs
UK MPs 2015–2017
UK MPs 2017–2019
UK MPs 2019–present